Milenković, Milenkovič, or Milenkovic (Cyrillic script: Миленковић) is a patronymic surname derived from a masculine given name Milenko. It may refer to:

Aleksandar Milenković (born 1967), Serbian cyclist, biathlete and cross-country skier
Aleksandar Milenković (born 1994), Austrian and Serbian football player
Ana Milenković (born 1980), Serbian singer, member of the band Beauty Queens
Anja Milenkovič (born 1982), Slovenian football player
Bojana Milenković (born 1997), Serbian volleyball player
Borko Milenković (born 1984), Serbian football player
Božidar Milenković (1954–2020), Serbian football player and coach
Dalibor Milenković (born 1987), Serbian football player
Dragan Milenković (born 1984), Macedonian basketball player
Gordana Milenković (born 1966), Serbian politician
Ivan Milenković (born 1983), Serbian football player
Marko Milenković (born 1974), Serbian politician
Marko Milenkovič (born 1976), Slovenian swimmer
Mirjana Milenković (born 1985), Montenegrin handball player
Nenad Milenković (born 1972), Serbian politician
Nikica Milenković (born 1959), Croatian football player and manager
Nikola Milenković (born 1997), Serbian football player
Ninoslav Milenković (born 1977), Bosnian football player
Olgica Milenkovic, electrical engineer from former Yugoslavia
Philip Milenković (born 1988), Swedish football player
Radoslav Milenković (born 1958), Serbian theatre director
Stefan Milenković (born 1977), Serbian concert violinist
Vid Milenkovic (born 1995), Swiss basketball player
Vladimir Milenković (born 1982), Serbian football player
Živojin Milenković (1928–2008), Serbian actor
Milenković family: Svetozar Milenković (1907–1983), Vida Milenković (1912–1992), and Aleksandar Petrović (1917–1944), Serbians who protected Jewish people during the Holocaust

See also

Melenki
Milanović
Milinković
Milinović
Milankovic (disambiguation)

Serbian surnames
Patronymic surnames